Another World is the fifth album by American jazz bassist John Patitucci. It was released in 1993.

Track listing

Personnel 
 John Patitucci – double bass, synthesizer, backing vocals
 Jeff Beal – trumpet, keyboards, programming
 Michael Brecker – tenor saxophone
 Steve Tavaglione – tenor saxophone, EWI
 Armand Sabal-Lecco – bass, piccolo bass, tenor bass, backing vocals
 John Beasley – keyboards, percussion, programming, backing vocals
 Andy Narell – steel pan
 Alex Acuña – African drums, percussion, backing vocals,
 William Kennedy – drums, percussion, backing vocals
 Dave Weckl – drums, percussion
 Luis Conte – percussion, backing vocals

Production
 Dave Grusin – producer
 Larry Rosen – producer
 Bernie Kirsh – engineer, mixing
 Darren Mora – assistant engineer
 Robert Read – assistant engineer
 Larry Mah – assistant engineer
 Bernie Grundman – mastering
 Joseph Doughney – mastering
 Michael Landy – mastering
 Adam Zelinka – mastering

References 

John Patitucci albums
1993 albums
GRP Records albums